Casper Gedsted Hansen (born 4 February 2002) is a Danish professional footballer, who plays as a right-back for Danish 1st Division side HB Køge.

Career

AaB
Born in Farsø, Gedsted started his career at Farsø/Ullits IK, before moving to AaB at the age of 13. In the summer 2021, Gedsted was promoted to the first team squad, after signing a professional five-year deal with the club.

On 31 August 2021, Gedsted got his official debut for the club in a Danish Cup game against FIUK, which Gedsted and co. won 13–0. On 20 March 2022, Gedsted got his debut in the Danish Superliga against Brøndby IF.

On 25 May 2022 AaB confirmed, that Gedsted's contract had been terminated by mutual consent, with following message: We made a long deal with Casper last year because we saw and still see potential in him. However, Casper has expressed impatience for more playing time, which we can't promise, and therefore we've agreed that the best solution right now is to terminate the agreement.

On 17 July 2022 it was reported, that Gedsted would go on a trial at Dutch Eerste Divisie club VVV-Venlo.

Ypsonas
On 17 August 2022 it was confirmed, that Gedsted had joined newly promoted Cypriot Second Division side Krasava Ypsonas. He got his debut for the club on 10 September 2022 against MEAP Nisou. He made a total of 13 appearances for the club, before returning to Denmark.

HB Køge
On 18 January 2023, Gedsted returned to Denmark, signing with Danish 1st Division side HB Køge, signing a deal until June 2024.

References

External links

Casper Gedsted at DBU

2002 births
Living people
Danish men's footballers
Danish expatriate men's footballers
Association football fullbacks
Denmark youth international footballers
People from Vesthimmerland Municipality
Danish Superliga players
Cypriot Second Division players
AaB Fodbold players
HB Køge players
Danish expatriate sportspeople in Cyprus
Expatriate footballers in Cyprus